Megalonychidae is an extinct family of sloths including the extinct Megalonyx. Megalonychids first appeared in the early Oligocene, about 35 million years (Ma) ago, in southern Argentina (Patagonia). There is actually one possible find dating to the Eocene, about 40 Ma ago, on Seymour Island in Antarctica (which was then still connected to South America). They first reached North America by island-hopping across the Central American Seaway, about 9 million years ago, prior to formation of the Isthmus of Panama about 2.7 million years ago (which led to the main pulse of the Great American Interchange). Some megalonychid lineages increased in size as time passed. The first species of these were small and may have been partly tree-dwelling, whereas the Pliocene (about 5 to 2 million years ago) species were already approximately half the size of the huge Late Pleistocene Megalonyx jeffersonii from the last ice age.

It was formerly believed, based on morphological comparisons, that Greater Antilles sloths and extant arboreal two-toed sloths were part of this family. However, molecular results based on sequences from collagen and mitochondrial DNA have shown that the former represent a basal branch of the sloth radiation, while the latter are more closely related to mylodontid sloths. The megalonychids plus nothrotheriid and megatheriid sloths, together with living three-toed sloths, make up the sloth superfamily Megatherioidea.

Megalonychid ground sloths became extinct in North and South America around the end of the Pleistocene.

Evolution

Megalonyx, which means "giant claw", is a widespread North American genus that lived past the close of the last (Wisconsin) glaciation, when so many large mammals died out. Remains have been found as far north as Alaska and the Yukon. Ongoing excavations at Tarkio Valley in southwest Iowa may reveal something of the familial life of Megalonyx. An adult was found in direct association with two juveniles of different ages, suggesting that adults cared for young of different generations.

The earliest known North American megalonychid, Pliometanastes protistus, lived in Florida and the southern U.S. about 9 million years ago, and is believed to have been the predecessor of Megalonyx. Several species of Megalonyx have been named; in fact, a 2000 article by Harington et al. in Arctic claimed that "nearly every good specimen has been described as a different species". A broader perspective on the group, accounting for age, sex, individual and geographic differences, indicates that only three species are valid (M. leptostomus, M. wheatleyi, and M. jeffersonii) in the late Pliocene and Pleistocene of North America.  Although work by McDonald lists five species.

Jefferson's ground sloth has a special place in modern paleontology, for Thomas Jefferson's letter on Megalonyx, read before the American Philosophical Society of Philadelphia, in August 1796, marked the beginning of vertebrate paleontology in North America. When Lewis and Clark set out, Jefferson instructed Meriwether Lewis to keep an eye out for ground sloths. He was hoping they would find some living in the Western range. Megalonyx jeffersonii was consequently named after Thomas Jefferson.

Phylogeny 
The following sloth family phylogenetic tree is based on collagen and mitochondrial DNA sequence data (see Fig. 4 of Presslee et al., 2019).

Here is a more detailed phylogenetic tree of the Megalonychidae, based on the work of Stinnesbeck and colleagues (2021).

References

Further reading

External links 
 Smithsonian National Zoological Park: At the Zoo - Slow and Steady Sloths

Prehistoric sloths
Prehistoric mammal families
Rupelian first appearances
Holocene extinctions
Taxa named by Paul Gervais